The 1988 Mr. Olympia contest was an IFBB professional bodybuilding competition held at the Universal Amphitheater on September 10, 1988, in Los Angeles, California.

Results

The total prize money awarded was $150,000.

Notable events

Lee Haney won his fifth consecutive Mr. Olympia title

References

External links 
 Mr. Olympia

 1988
1988 in American sports
Mr. Olympia
1988 in bodybuilding